McGeachin is a surname. Notable people with the surname include:

 Geoffrey McGeachin (born 1949), Australian photographer 
 Janice McGeachin (born 1963), American politician

See also
 McGeachie